Frei Caneca Street (local Brazilian ) is an important LGBT Street in the city of São Paulo, Brazil, that starts at the Paulista Avenue and ends at Augusta Street. In the street is located the famous gay nightclub A Loca, and the gay friendly Shopping Frei Caneca.

See also

 Gay village
 LGBT rights in Brazil
 LGBT rights in the World

References

Streets in São Paulo
Gay villages in Brazil